Alexander Sergeyevich Dargomyzhsky was a 19th-century Russian composer. He bridged the gap in Russian opera composition between Mikhail Glinka and the later generation of The Five and Pyotr Ilyich Tchaikovsky.

Biography 
Dargomyzhsky was born in village Troitskoye, Belyov uyezd, Tula Governorate (now Arsenyevsky District, Tula Oblast), and educated in Saint Petersburg. He was already known as a talented musical amateur when in 1833 he met Mikhail Glinka and was encouraged to devote himself to composition. His opera Esmeralda (libretto by composer, based on Victor Hugo's The Hunchback of Notre Dame) was composed in 1839 (performed 1847), and his Rusalka was performed in 1856; but he had little success or recognition either at home or abroad, except in Belgium, until the 1860s, when he became the elder statesman, but not a member, of The Five.

His last opera, The Stone Guest, is his most famous work, known as a pioneering effort in melodic recitative.  With the orchestration and the end of the first scene left incomplete at his death, it was finished by César Cui and Nikolai Rimsky-Korsakov, and was much prized by The Five for what was perceived as its progressive approach to operatic expression.  It was premiered in 1872, but never became a lasting standard operatic repertoire item.

Dargomyzhsky also left some unfinished opera projects, among them an attempted setting of Pushkin's Poltava, from which a duet survives.  Besides operas, his other compositions include numerous songs, piano pieces, and some orchestral works.

He died in Saint Petersburg in 1869, aged 55.

Bibliography 
 Richard Taruskin, Opera and Drama in Russia As Preached and Practiced in the 1860s.  New ed.  Rochester:  University of Rochester Press, 1993.
 Cui, La musique en Russie (Paris, 1880)
 Pougin, Essai historique sur la musique en Russie (Turin, 1897)
 Fétis, Biographie universelle des musiciens (Paris, 1862)

Notes

References 

 This work in turn cites:

External links 

1813 births
1869 deaths
19th-century classical composers
19th-century male musicians
Burials at Tikhvin Cemetery
Male opera composers
People from Belyovsky District
Russian male classical composers
Russian opera composers
Russian Romantic composers